Prototheora serruligera is a species of moth of the family Prototheoridae. It is found in South Africa.

The wingspan is 21–22 mm. Adults have been recorded from January to mid-March.

References

Endemic moths of South Africa
Hepialoidea
Moths of Africa
Moths described in 1920